Hard Traveling is a 1986 American drama film written and directed by Dan Bessie and starring J. E. Freeman, Ellen Geer and Barry Corbin.  It is based on the 1941 novel Bread and a Stone by Alvah Bessie, the father of Dan Bessie.

Premise
Illiterate and unemployed, Ed Sloan marries widowed schoolteacher Norah Gilbert and becomes the stepfather of her two sons; but after not being able to find employment, Ed ends up murdering a businessman.

Cast
J. E. Freeman as Ed Sloan
Ellen Geer as Norah Gilbert Sloan
Barry Corbin as Frank Burton
James Gammon as Sergeant Slattery
Jim Haynie as Lieutenant Fisher
W. Scott DeVenney as Bill Gilbert

Reception
Walter Goodman of The New York Times gave the film a negative review and wrote, "A true story? Sure. It's true to an ideology-generated fiction that was always false to life and to art."

Kevin Thomas of the Los Angeles Times also gave it a negative review and wrote that the film "is all the more disappointing because it so clearly could have been so much better."

References

External links
 
 

1986 drama films
American drama films
1980s English-language films
1980s American films